John McClure may refer to:

 John McClure (admiral) (1837–1920), Scottish admiral in the Imperial Chinese Navy
 John McClure (judge) (died 1915), American judge and politician
 John McClure (poet) (1893–1956), American poet
 John McClure (producer) (1929–2014), music producer
 John J. McClure (1886–1965), American politician from Pennsylvania
 Sir John William Maclure, 1st Baronet, British politician

See also
 McClure (surname)